Sutkagan Dor (or Sutkagen Dor) is the westernmost known archaeological site of the Indus Valley civilization. It is located about 480 km west of Karachi on the Makran coast near Gwadar, close to the Iranian border, in Pakistan's Baluchistan Province. The site is near the western bank of the Dasht River and its confluence with a smaller stream, known as the Gajo Kaur. It was a smaller settlement with substantial stone walls and gateways.

Excavations
Sutkagan Dor was discovered in 1875 by Major Edward Mockler, who conducted small-scale excavation.

In 1928 Aurel Stein visited the area as part of his Gedrosia tour, and carried out further digs. In October 1960, Sutkagan Dor was more extensively excavated by George F. Dales as a part of his Makran Survey, uncovering structures made from stone and mud bricks without straw.

Architecture
This site measures approximately 4.5 hectares (300 × 150 m). Along with the typical "citadel" and "lower town", there is a massive fortification wall of semi-dressed stones. This citadel wall varies in height and thickness due to the irregular contours of the natural rock foundation, but at one point about midway along the eastern wall, it is approximately 7.5 m thick at the base. The inner face of the wall is slightly battered, whereas the outer face has a decided slope, varying from 23° to 40°.

Coastal route
Though inland at present, the site may have been near navigable water in ancient times, on a trade route between other centers. A coastal route existed linking sites such as Lothal and Dholavira to Sutkagan Dor on the Makran coast. It has been suggested that the site may well have been an important trading post, connecting seaborne trade from the Persian Gulf and the Arabian Sea to the hinterland.

Findings
Stein recovered 127 flint blades without cores measuring up to 27.5 cm. Stone vessels, stone arrowheads, copper arrowheads, shell beads, pottery, and various other items were found. A copper-bronze disc probably associated with the Bactria–Margiana Archaeological Complex (BMAC) was also discovered there.

See also
 Indus Valley civilization
 List of Indus Valley Civilization sites
 List of inventions and discoveries of the Indus Valley Civilization
 Hydraulic engineering of the Indus Valley Civilization
 Manda, Jammu, northernmost IVC site (excluding Shortugai)
 Alamgirpur, easternmost IVC site
 Sutkagan Dor, westernmost IVC site
 Daimabad, southernmost IVC site
 Sokhta Koh
 Malwan

References

External links 
 Indus Valley sites

Archaeological sites in Balochistan, Pakistan
Indus Valley civilisation sites
Former populated places in Pakistan